FERM domain-containing protein 7 is a protein that in humans is encoded by the FRMD7 gene.

References

External links
 GeneReviews/NIH/NCBI/UW entry on FRMD7-Related Infantile Nystagmus

Further reading